Greek hip hop groups

Xylina Spathia were a popular Greek band from Thessaloniki, distinguished by their special and personal sound, which was unprecedented for the Greek music of the era. Along with Trypes, they are considered to have been the most popular band in Greece of the 1990s.

Their music combines elements from pop, rock and electronic music, maintaining a Greek melodic "colour" at the same time. The personal and experimental lyrics of Pavlos Pavlidis are distinguished for their poetry and the pictures that they give. Generally the band's songs develop an emotional atmosphere, that is sometimes expressed with extroversion and bold rhythms and else with a calm innerness.

From 1993 until their break-up, in 2003, the band released 5 albums (4 studio, 1 live) and 1 CD single. Although they had a big commercial success from early on, the group avoided media exposure and maintained their artistic autonomy, seeking to develop their sound from album to album and during their live performances, where they used to experiment and improvise with their songs.

The original line-up of the group consisted of: Pavlos Pavlidis (vocals, guitar), Vasilis Gountaroulis (keyboards, samplers), Christos Tsaprazis (bass) and Panos Tolios (drums, percussion 1993–1997). Members of the band had also been: Stavros Rossopoulos (guitar 1993–1994), Takis Kanellos (drums 1997), Giannis Mitsis (drums 1998–2003), Kostas Pantelis (guitar 2000–2003) and Nikos Kyriakopoulos (percussion, backing vocals 2001–2003). Session musicians that appeared in the band's albums are: Dimos Gountaroulis (cello), Giorgos Tolios (percussion), Giorgos Papazoglou (percussion), Rita Hatzinikoli (percussion), Fotis Siotas (violin) and Aristeidis Hatzistavrou (classical guitar).

Xylina Spathia are one of the best-selling Greek bands, along with Pyx Lax and Trypes.

History 
In 1989, after his participation in the Greek rock band Mora sti Fotia (Greek: Μωρά στη Φωτιά, English: Babies on Fire), Pavlos Pavlidis travelled to France and stayed with Nikos Kantaris in Mériel, a commune near Paris. They created the Brancaleone studio and Pavlidis recorded the first demos of his songs. The first two albums of the band were dedicated to Nikos Kantaris. While in Paris, Pavlidis also met Giannis Mitsis, who became a band member in 1998.
 
In 1992, Pavlidis returned to Thessaloniki and along with Vasilis Gountaroulis, Christos Tsaprazis, Panos Tolios and Stavros Rossopoulos started to work on the material that he had prepared during his stay in France. With this line-up they appeared live, for the first time, in Karditsa under the name "Brancaleone". They later changed their name to "Xylina Spathia" from the homonymous novel by Pantelis Kaliotsos.

In 1993, the band's first album, "Xessaloniki" was released by Ano Kato Records. The album contained 12 songs which were recorded from September to October 1993 in Magnanimous studio, owned by Giorgos Pentzikis in Thessaloniki. Christos Harbilas was the sound engineer. Two of the songs ("To nero pou kylaei" and "Poulia 2") were recorded in Brancaleone studio in 1992. The album contained well-known songs such as "Adrenalini", "Treno fantasma", "Rodes", "Siopi" and the hit "O vasilias tis skonis", which became very popular and is considered as a classic Greek rock song. A review of the album by the mic.gr website in 2005 stated: "Xessaloniki is something much more than what phenomenally was back in 1993: a new stream for Greek rock...".

In 1994, the band appeared live in cities throughout Greece. Their songs were played on the radio, while their public reception was positive and their fans were steadily increasing. During this period Stavros Rossopoulos left the band, without being replaced by another guitarist.

In 1995, the band's second album, "Pera apo tis poleis tis asfaltou" was released by Virgin Records. The album contains 10 songs which were recorded from September to November 1994 in Magnanimous studio. Some of the songs that appear in the album are "Rita", "Oti thes esy", "Fotia sto limani", "Atlantis" and "Liomeno pagoto", which is the group's biggest commercial success. Because of some legal problems that the band had with their previous label, the album was withdrawn for a short time, but the group was vindicated and the album returned on sale. Dionysis Savvopoulos also testified on the trial. Sales and radio broadcasts exceed by far the expectations of the band and Pavlos Pavlidis stated: "People help you go higher, if you have to go somewhere...".

In 1996, "Pera apo tis poleis tis asfaltou" became gold. The band gave concerts throughout Greece and gained a wide audience. "Liomeno pagoto" and "Fotia sto limani" became the super hits among youngsters.

In 1997, the band's third album, "Mia matia san vrohi" was released by Virgin Records. It contained 10 songs which were recorded from January to April 1997 in Magnanimous studio. The album's hits were "Vrohopoios", "Den ehei telos", "Ena paraxeno tragoudi", "Sto vraho", "Allazei prosopa I thlipsi" and the explosive song "Robot". "Mia matia san vrohi" was the group's finest album and probably their most important (artistic) release. With this release the band made clear their intention to experiment in more electronic sound paths and Vasilis Gountaroulis played the leading role in the band's composition, in which all the members took part. In an interview, in 1997, Pavlos stated: "What was of my interest from the beginning, was a band that given the success, would go further. When we met together with the guys, I saw that we were a good group with unpredictable development. Now, in the third disc material, the work is total and the ideas jump out from everywhere.". During the same year the band continued their concerts in Greece and Cyprus, with the climax event of Vyronas Festival, where a record of 8,000 people was gathered. In the fall of the year, after an invitation from MTV, they appeared in H.Q. club in London. This was their first appearance without Panos Tolios, who left the band and was replaced by Takis Kanellos of Mode Plagal.

In 1998, "Pera apo tis poleis tis asfaltou" became platinum and "Mia matia san vrohi" became gold. Their appearances in Rodon (Athens) and Mylos, Thessaloniki were sold out. In July they appeared in Rockwave Festival '98 and in September they opened the Rolling Stones concert in Athens. Pavlos Pavlidis stated: "The idea of singing in front of 80,000 people is crazy. When we finished, the Stones manager told me: "You are among the few bands that escaped the bottles. In our tours we have a special staff to clean the stage from bottles thrown to support groups. Today the staff will rest. "When I asked him which bands had also escaped the bottles he told me: "Some of the bands I can recall are the Smashing Pumpkins and Red Hot Chili Peppers. By the fall of the year, the band revisited Great Britain and appeared in Hacienda Manchester. Takis Kanellos could not follow the band's full schedule and gave his place to Giannis Mitsis.

In 1999, the EP "Trofi gia ta thiria" was released by Virgin Records. It contained 4 songs, which were recorded from April to May 1999 in Agrotikon studio owned by Nikos Papazoglou in Thessaloniki. These songs were indicative of the band's double sound direction. On one hand, calm and atmospherical compositions ("Diastimoploia" and "Hathika") and on the other hand, explosive dancing rhythms and electronic sounds ("Trofi gia ta thiria" and "Tora arhizo kai thymamai"). In fact, this single was the precursor of their next and final studio album that would be released a year later. In the meantime, the band continued their live appearances with success. Kostas Pantelis also joined the band.

In 2000, the band's fourth and last studio album, "Enas kyklos ston aera" was released by Virgin Records. The album contained 10 songs, which were recorded from May to June 2000 in Magnanimous studio, with Christos Megas and Martin Ekman as sound engineers.The most recognisable songs of the album are "I teleutaia fora", "Ti perimenoun", "O navagos", "San esena", "Hartinos ouranos" and "Pare me mazi sou", the band's last hit.Earlier that winter, Pavlos Pavlidis went to Amorgos, where he created most of the songs that appeared in the album, in the home studio that he had created."Enas kyklos ston aera" was probably the most divided (creatively) album of the band, as the contradictory musical directions that had been followed in the previous album, were becoming clearer. As a result, strong and dancing songs such as "Ti perimenoun", coexisted with slow, almost whispering compositions such as "O navagos".Despite these minor problems, the band seemed that it was crossing its most mature period, testifying an album that did not probably had the integrity and the exuberance of "Mia matia san vrohi" or the momentum of "Xessaloniki", but could be maintained on a high level and was the product of an all that had worked with its sound all those years and, closing its career, was still creative and unpredictable.

During the following years (2001–2002), the band continued its successful concerts throughout Greece playing  new songs, while a sixth member, Nikos Kyriakopoulos, who played the percussion and sung the backing vocals, joined the line-up. The climate seemed to be positive and a new creative period seemed to have opened. Despite the new plans of the group, the break-up was near.

In 2003, the band's "Live" album was released by Virgin Records. The album contained 16 songs, which were presented live in concerts that were played from February to November 2001 and were recorded by the mobile recording unit of Polytropon and Octal One studios, with Christos Megas, Makis Pelopidas, Kostas Vamvoukas, Argyris Papageorgiou, Giorgos Kazantzis and Vagelis Kalaras as sound engineers.All of the songs came from previous works of the group except for a new one, "Grand Hotel". At the end of the song, Pavlidis can be heard saying: 'Thank you...This is the first time we are playing it...". "Live" was an album that attempted to record the explosive climate that was prevailing during the band's concerts and confirm the group's reputation as a dynamic live band. In this album were also recorded the improvisational feeling and the evolution of the band's sound all those years.This could be seen on the songs from their two first albums, which are almost unrecognisable. It should also be mentioned that the album does not contain the group's big hits, something that intentionally happened, in order to view songs that the band loved, but had lived in the shadow of the big commercial successes. Especially, "Liomeno pagoto" was thought to be an overplayed song. "Live" was the band's valedictory album and was dedicated "to those who were with us all those nights...".

By the fall of 2003, Xylina Spathia broke up and the band members followed different musical directions. Their work continues to be recognised and along with Pavlos Sidiropoulos and Trypes, they are considered to be among the artists who defined Greek rock.

In 2005, two years after the group's break-up, "The Best Of" was released by Virgin Records. It contained 16 songs from the group's previous works and a bonus track by Viton & Stel, entitled "Wooden Swordz". There was no contribution by any of the band's members in the release of the album.

Discography

Ξεσσαλονίκη (Xessaloniki)
Label: Ano Kato Records
Format: 1 CD
Release date: 1993

Track list
Αφού σου το 'πα (Afou sou to pa, I told you so)
Ερώτηση κλειδί (Erotisi kleidi, Key question)
Ξεσσαλονίκη (Xessaloniki)
Ο καβαλάρης του τρόμου (O kavalaris tou tromou, The rider of fear)
Το νερό που κυλάει (To nero pou kylaei, The water that flows)
Πουλιά 1 (Poulia, Birds)
Ο βασιλιάς της σκόνης (O vasilias tis skonis, The king of dust)
Αδρεναλίνη (Adrenalini, Adrenaline)
Τραίνο φάντασμα (Treno fantasma, Phantom train)
Σιωπή (Siopi, Silence)
Πουλιά 2
Ρόδες (Rodes, Wheels)
Λόλα (Lola)
Το νερό που κυλάει 2

Πέρα απ' τις πόλεις της ασφάλτου (Pera ap' tis polis tis asphaltou, Beyond the cities of asphalt)
Label: Virgin Records
Format: 1 CD
Release date: 1995

Track list
Λιωμένο παγωτό (Liomeno pagoto, Melted ice-cream)
Ρίτα (Rita)
Ο εξορκιστής (O exorkistis, The exorcist)
Ό,τι θες εσύ (O,ti thes esy, Whatever you want)
Φωτιά στο λιμάνι (Photia sto limani, Fire at the port)
Ατλαντίς (Atlantis)
O Κάιν (O Kain, Cain)
Μη ρωτάς (Mi rotas, Don't ask)
Οι συμμορίες της ασφάλτου (I symmories tis asphaltou, The gangs of asphalt)
Μη ρωτάς (Remix 2)

Μια ματιά σαν βροχή (Mia matia san vrohi, A glimpse like rain)
Label: Virgin Records
Format: 1 CD
Release date: 1997

Track list
Ρομπότ (Robot)
Το καράβι (To karavi, The ship)
Ζεστός αέρας (Zestos aeras, Hot wind)
Έχεις ξανάρθει εδώ (Eheis xanarthei edo, You've been here before)
Βροχοποιός (Vrohopoios, Rainmaker)
Δεν έχει τέλος (Den ehei telos, It has no end)
Ένα παράξενο τραγούδι (Ena paraxeno tragoudi, A strange song)
Στο βράχο (Sto vraho, At the rock)
Μόνο αυτό (Mono auto, Only that)
Αλλάζει πρόσωπα η θλίψη (Allazei prosopa I thlipsi, Sorrow changes faces)

Τροφή για τα θηρία (Trofi gia ta thiria, Food for the beasts)
Label: Virgin Records
Format: 1 CD S
Release date: 1999

Track list
Τροφή για τα θηρία (Trofi gia ta thiria, Food for the beasts)
Διαστημόπλοια (Diastimoploia, Spaceships)
Χάθηκα (Hathika, I'm lost)
Τώρα αρχίζω και θυμάμαι (Tora arhizo kai thimamai, Now I begin to remember)

Ένας κύκλος στον αέρα (Enas kyklos ston aera, A circle in the air)
Label: Virgin Records
Format: 1 CD
Release date: 2000

Track list
Η τελευταία φορά (I teleutaia fora, The last time)
Πάρε με μαζί σου (Pare me mazi sou, Take me with you)
Στο Νότο (Sto Noto, To the South)
Τι περιμένουν (Ti perimenoun, What are they waiting for)
Ο ναυαγός (O navagos, The castaway)
Κοιτάζω τα σπίτια (Koitazo ta spitia, I'm looking at the houses)
Σαν εσένα (San esena, Like you)
Πρέπει να έρθεις (Prepei na ertheis, You should come)
Χάρτινος ουρανός (Hartinos ouranos, Paper sky)
Οι δαίμονες (Oi daimones, The demons)

Live
Label: Virgin Records
Format: 1 CD
Release date: 2003

Track list
Ατλαντίς
Ρίτα
Ένα παράξενο τραγούδι
Ρόδες
Τι περιμένουν
Τα πουλιά
Σαν εσένα
Γκραντ Οτέλ (Grand Hotel)
Στο βράχο
Τώρα αρχίζω και θυμάμαι
Δεν έχει τέλος
Τρένο φάντασμα
Πάρε με μαζί σου
Αδρεναλίνη
Κοιτάζω τα σπίτια

The Best Of
Label: Virgin Records
Format: 1 CD
Release date: 2005

Track list
Λιωμένο παγωτό
Ρίτα
Φωτιά στο λιμάνι
Ατλαντίς
Ο βασιλιάς της σκόνης
Βροχοποιός
Ένα παράξενο τραγούδι
Κοιτάζω τα σπίτια
Η τελευταία φορά
Γκραντ Οτέλ (Live)
Αδρεναλίνη
Πάρε με μαζί σου
Αλλάζει πρόσωπα η θλίψη
Τροφή για τα θηρία
Διαστημόπλοια
Σαν εσένα
Wooden Swordz - Viton & Stel (bonus)

Greek rock music groups
Musical groups from Thessaloniki